Amit Bimrot is an Indian actor who is best known for his role in film Raid and Netflix web series Bard of Blood.

Early life and education 
Bimrot was born in Mehsana, Gujarat and brought up in Alwar, Rajasthan. He studied film and acting at the Film and Television Institute of India (FTII, Pune)  before moving to Mumbai to start his career as an actor. He was doing theatre in Jaipur. and was associated with Sarthak Theatre Group Association and was mentored by popular theatre artist Sabir Khan. After his move to Mumbai he did several advertisements and  made his feature film debut with Ajay Devgn in the 2018 film Raid directed by Raj Kumar Gupta.

Acting career 
Bimrot made his Bollywood debut in 2018 with super hit film Raid. He next appeared in the web series Bard of Blood produced by Red Chilies Entertainment for Netflix. He has also worked in Dinesh Vijan production film Made in China. His next big venture is Abhishek Mamgain directed Barkha Sarkar where he will be seen playing struggling theater actor Badal Sarkar.

His television commercial work includes Parle G, JK Tyre and Vicks.

Filmography

Personal life 
Amit Bimrot belongs to a middle-class family of Meena Tribe from Rajasthan Now live in Gujrat. His father is a retired CTI from Indian Railways.

References

External links
Amit bimrot on IMDB

Living people
Indian male film actors
Male actors in Hindi cinema
1990 births